The Battle of Pometia took place in 502 BC, a year after a revolt by two Latin towns, Pometia and Cora, against Rome.  A Roman army led by the consuls Agrippa Menenius Lanatus and Publius Postumius Tubertus was eventually successful in forcing the Pometians to surrender.

Background 
In 503 BC, two Latin towns, Pometia and Cora, said by Livy to be colonies of Rome, revolted against Rome. They had the assistance of the southern Aurunci tribe.

Battle
Livy says that a Roman army led by the consuls Agrippa Menenius Lanatus and Publius Postumius Tubertus met the enemy on the frontiers and was victorious, after which the war was confined to Pometia.  Livy says many enemy prisoners were slaughtered by each side.  Livy also says that the consuls celebrated a triumph, however the Fasti Triumphales record that an ovation was celebrated by Postumius and a triumph by Menenius, both over the Sabines.

Aftermath
In the following year the consuls were Opiter Virginius and Spurius Cassius.  Livy says that they attempted to take Pometia by storm, but then resorted to siege engines.  However the Aurunci launched a successful sally, destroying the siege engines, wounding many, and nearly killing one of the consuls.  The Romans retreated to Rome, recruited additional troops, and returned to Pometia.  They rebuilt the siege engines and when they were about to take the town, the Pometians surrendered. The Aurunci leaders were beheaded, the Pometians sold into slavery, the town razed and the land sold.  Livy says the consuls celebrated a triumph as a result of the victory.  The Fasti Triumphales record only one triumph, by Cassius (possibly over the Sabines although the inscription is unclear).

References

503 BC
6th-century BC conflicts
6th century BC in the Roman Republic
Battles involving the Roman Republic